Arazap is a town in the Armavir Province of Armenia.

See also 
Armavir Province

References 

World Gazeteer: Armenia – World-Gazetteer.com

Populated places in Armavir Province
Yazidi populated places in Armenia